Ivor Léon John Bueb (6 June 1923 – 1 August 1959) was a British professional sports car racing and Formula One driver from England.

Career
Born in East Ham, Essex east of London, Bueb started racing seriously in a Formula Three 500cc Cooper in 1953, graduating to the Cooper works team in 1955 when he finished second in the British championship. He made occasional starts in Grands Prix in 1957 with a Connaught and a Maserati run by Gilby Engineering. The following year he raced Bernie Ecclestone's Connaught at Monaco, and drove a Formula Two Lotus at the German Grand Prix.

In 1959 he had two outings for BRP, firstly a non-qualification at Monaco, then another Formula Two entry at the British Grand Prix. He participated in six Formula One World Championship Grands Prix in all, but scored no championship points. He also participated in numerous non-Championship Formula One races. With the death of Archie Scott Brown at Spa in May 1958, Brian Lister hired Bueb to fill the now-vacant Lister-Jaguar driver's seat. Bueb did an admirable job, scoring several first places at tracks such as Crystal Palace and Goodwood during the 1958 and 1959 sports car campaigns.

Bueb is perhaps best known for sharing the winning works Jaguar D-type with Mike Hawthorn in the 1955 24 Hours of Le Mans which was marred by an accident in which 82 spectators were killed; a success he repeated with Ron Flockhart in the ex-works Ecurie Ecosse car in 1957.

He suffered serious injuries in 1959 when he crashed his BRP Cooper-Borgward Formula Two car at the Charade Circuit near Clermont-Ferrand, France. He crashed at Gravenoire, a multiple apex-section at the very far end of the circuit, and was thrown out of his Cooper. After being carried off the circuit by Gendarmes in a way that probably worsened his injuries, Bueb died six days later at a hospital near the circuit.

It was Ivor Bueb's death, in conjunction with Archie Scott Brown's demise, that finally led Brian Lister to shut down his very successful sports car racing effort.

Racing record

Complete Formula One World Championship results
(key)

* Formula 2 entry.

Complete British Saloon Car Championship results
(key) (Races in bold indicate pole position; races in italics indicate fastest lap.)

Complete 24 Hours of Le Mans results

Complete 12 Hours of Sebring results

References

External links
Ivor Bueb profile at The 500 Owners Association

1923 births
1959 deaths
People from East Ham
English racing drivers
European Formula Two Championship drivers
British Formula Three Championship drivers
24 Hours of Le Mans drivers
24 Hours of Le Mans winning drivers
English Formula One drivers
Connaught Formula One drivers
Gilby Engineering Formula One drivers
British Racing Partnership Formula One drivers
Racing drivers who died while racing
Sport deaths in France
British Touring Car Championship drivers
World Sportscar Championship drivers
Sportspeople from Essex
12 Hours of Reims drivers
Ecurie Ecosse drivers